USS Tern is the name of more than one United States Navy ship, and may refer to:

 , a patrol boat in commission from 1917 to 1918
 , a minesweeper in commission from 1919 to 1945

United States Navy ship names